Gros-Morne is an arrondissement in the Artibonite department of Haiti.

Artibonite (department)
Arrondissements of Haiti